Pacificulla thrasydora is a moth in the family Lecithoceridae. It was described by Edward Meyrick in 1910. It is endemic to New Guinea.

The forewings are purplish black with a broad orange fascia rising from the dorsum beyond the middle and running towards three-fourths of the costa but not reaching it. The hindwings are purplish black with a broad orange fascia from the middle of the costa to the outer half of the dorsum, occupying the median third of the wing.

References

thrasydora
Moths of New Guinea
Moths described in 1910
Taxa named by Edward Meyrick
Endemic fauna of New Guinea